Arthur August Reinholz (January 27, 1903 – December 29, 1980) was a Major League Baseball third baseman who played for one season. He played for the Cleveland Indians for two games during the 1928 Cleveland Indians season.

External links

1903 births
1980 deaths
Major League Baseball third basemen
Cleveland Indians players
Raleigh Capitals players
Kinston Eagles players
Winston-Salem Twins players
Terre Haute Tots players
Baseball players from Michigan